There have been 46 (including gravity-assist flybys) space missions to the planet Venus. Missions to Venus constitute part of the exploration of Venus.

List
As of 2020, the Soviet Union, United States, European Space Agency and Japan have conducted missions to Venus.

Mission Type Legend

Future missions

Under development

Venus Missions by Organization/Company

Proposed missions

References

External links

 

Venus

Venus
Missions to Venus